Kenneth Herbert Clayton Woodroffe (9 December 1892 − 13 May 1915) was an English first-class cricketer and British Army officer who was killed in action during World War I.

Woodroffe was born in Lewes, East Sussex and was educated at Marlborough College. He was a Right-hand batsman and bowled Right-arm fast. He played for Hampshire (1912–1913), Cambridge University (1913–1914), and Sussex (1914). 
 
On 9 May 1915, as a second lieutenant in the 6th Battalion, Rifle Brigade (The Prince Consort's Own), attached to the 2nd Battalion, Welsh Regiment, he was killed in action near Neuve-Chappelle, France, aged 22. He was also mentioned in dispatches. His 19-year-old brother, Second Lieutenant Sidney Woodroffe (8th Rifle Brigade), was killed two months after him in 1915 while showing such bravery that he was awarded the Victoria Cross.

References

External links
Cricket Archive profile
Cricket Info profile

1892 births
1915 deaths
Military personnel from Sussex
People from Lewes
People educated at Marlborough College
Rifle Brigade officers
British Army personnel of World War I
British military personnel killed in World War I
Cambridge University cricketers
Hampshire cricketers
Sussex cricketers
English cricketers
Alumni of Pembroke College, Cambridge